"Celebrate" is a song written by Gary Bonner and Alan Gordon and performed by Three Dog Night.  It was featured on their 1969 album, Suitable for Framing  and was produced by Gabriel Mekler.  

In the US, "Celebrate" peaked at #15 on the Billboard chart in 1970.  Outside the US, "Celebrate" reached #8 in Canada.

Background
The song featured the horn section from the rock band Chicago, who at that time, were known as the Chicago Transit Authority.

Other versions
 Plastic Penny, on a 1970 compilation titled Heads I Win - Tails You Lose, with the title of "Celebrity Ball".
Uriah Heep, on their 1994 album, The Lansdowne Tapes.

References

1969 songs
1970 singles
Songs written by Alan Gordon (songwriter)
Three Dog Night songs
Uriah Heep (band) songs
Dunhill Records singles